Heroína is the second studio album by Colombian singer-songwriter Nina Rodríguez, released on March 17, 2017. The album received critical acclaim from the music press, earning praise for its alternative sound and Nina songwriting and emotive singing style.

Track listing

References

2017 albums
Nina Rodríguez albums